Joey Lynn King (born July 30, 1999) is an American actress. She first gained recognition for portraying Ramona Quimby in the comedy film Ramona and Beezus (2010) and has since gained wider recognition for her lead role in The Kissing Booth (2018) and its two sequels. King received critical acclaim for her starring role in the crime drama series The Act (2019), for which she was nominated for both a Primetime Emmy Award and a Golden Globe Award.

King has also appeared in the films Battle: Los Angeles (2011), Crazy, Stupid, Love (2011), The Dark Knight Rises (2012), The Conjuring (2013), White House Down (2013), Independence Day: Resurgence (2016),  Bullet Train (2022) and The Princess (2022), as well as the first and second seasons of the FX black comedy crime drama series Fargo (2014–2015).

Early life
King was born in Los Angeles, California, to Terry and Jamie King. King began acting professionally at the age of 4, starting with a commercial for Life Cereal. She has also been in commercials for AT&T, Kay Jewelers, and Eggo. King attended Phoenix Ranch School in Simi Valley. As a child, King sang a cappella for a talent show at the Simi Valley Cultural Arts Center. She also performed with the Stage Door Children's Theatre in Agoura. She has two older sisters, actresses Kelli King and Hunter King. King has stated, "I'm Jewish, but I'm not really, really religious."

Career

20082016: Beginnings and child acting
King voiced the yellow fur ball Katie in the animated feature Horton Hears a Who! (2008). She also appeared in Quarantine (2008). In 2010, she guest-starred in the series Ghost Whisperer. She was also featured in The Suite Life of Zack & Cody as Emily Mason in two episodes. Other television appearances include Entourage, CSI: Crime Scene Investigation, Medium., and Life in Pieces.

King's first lead role was in the 2010 film Ramona and Beezus, an adaptation of the Beverly Cleary book series, starring as Ramona Quimby. She also released a single for the movie called "Ramona Blue". Her role in the film won her a Young Artist Award.

King was featured in Battle: Los Angeles, where she played a girl named Kirsten. Also in 2011, she co-starred in Crazy, Stupid, Love. As well, she appeared in Taylor Swift's "Mean" music video as a young student at the school cafeteria rejected by her peers.

King had a role in Christopher Nolan's third Batman film, The Dark Knight Rises (2012), as a young Talia al Ghul. She also filmed the short-lived comedy series Bent, had guest appearances in New Girl and was on the final episode of The Haunting Hour: The Series, "Goodwill Towards Men." In 2013, King appeared in Oz the Great and Powerful, Family Weekend, White House Down, and The Conjuring. In 2014, she appeared in Wish I Was Here, as well as in Fargo as Greta Grimly, daughter of police officer Gus Grimly.

In 2016, King was cast in the coming-of-age drama film The Possibility of Fireflies. She played the lead character Clare in the 2017 horror-thriller film Wish Upon. She also had a role in Slender Man which was released in 2018.

2017present: The Kissing Booth and The Act
In 2018, she starred as Elle Evans in Netflix's teen romantic comedy The Kissing Booth. She reprised the role in the sequel The Kissing Booth 2, released in 2020, and in The Kissing Booth 3, which was released on August 11, 2021.

In 2019, she starred in the true crime anthology television series The Act on Hulu. King was cast as Gypsy Rose Blanchard, a role which required King to shave her head for the third time in her career. It earned her nominations for Emmy, Golden Globe, SAG and Critics' Choice awards. She also appeared on the fourth season of CBS comedy Life in Pieces as Morgan.

King is represented by talent agent Dan Spilo. In August 2020, she signed a deal with Hulu to produce television content for its service. In July 2021, her All The King's Horses production company struck a deal with Netflix.

Personal life
King began a relationship with producer and director Steven Piet in September 2019 after they met on the set of The Act; they became engaged in February 2022.

Filmography

Film

Television

Video games

Music videos

Awards and nominations 

At the 2015 Vancouver International Film Festival, the Canadian Images features jury made an honourable mention recognizing King as an Emerging Actress for her performance in Borealis.

References

External links

 

1999 births
21st-century American actresses
Actresses from Los Angeles
American child actresses
American film actresses
American television actresses
American voice actresses
Jewish American actresses
Living people
21st-century American Jews